The 2021–22 Illinois Fighting Illini men's basketball team represented the University of Illinois in the 2021–22 NCAA Division I men's basketball season. Led by fifth-year head coach Brad Underwood, the Illini played their home games at the State Farm Center in Champaign, Illinois as members of the Big Ten Conference. They finished the season 23–10, 15–5 in Big Ten play to finish in a two-way tie for the regular-season championship. As the No. 1 seed in the Big Ten tournament, they were defeated by No. 9 seed Indiana in the Quarterfinals. They received an at-large bid to the NCAA tournament as the No. 4 seed in the South Region, where they defeated Chattanooga in the First Round before losing to Houston in the Second Round.

Previous season
In a season limited due to the ongoing COVID-19 pandemic, the Illini finished the 2020–21 season 24–7, 16–4 in Big Ten play to finish in second place. They defeated Rutgers, Iowa, and Ohio State to win the Big Ten tournament and receive the conference's automatic bid to the NCAA tournament. As the No. 1 seed in the Midwest region, they defeated Drexel in the First Round before being upset by No. 8-seeded Loyola–Chicago.

Offseason
Illini big man Kofi Cockburn declared for the 2021 NBA draft, before ultimately withdrawing and entering the transfer portal. After considering offers from Kentucky and Florida State, he opted to return to Illinois.

Departures

Incoming transfers

2021 recruiting class

Roster

Schedule and results

|-
!colspan=9 style=| Exhibition

|-
!colspan=9 style=| Regular season

|-
!colspan=9 style=| Big Ten tournament

|-
!colspan=9 style=| NCAA tournament

Source

Rankings

*AP does not release post-NCAA Tournament rankings^Coaches did not release a Week 1 poll.

References

2021–22 Big Ten Conference men's basketball season
2021-22
2021 in sports in Illinois
2022 in sports in Illinois
Illinois